Arrested Youth is a digital EP by the American pop punk band The Dollyrots.  It was released on August 9, 2011 on the band's own "Arrested Youth Records". 30 physical CD copies were made, these were initially made available on their 2011 summer tour, with then the remaining copies were sold via their web site.

Track listing

References 

2011 EPs
The Dollyrots albums